Water polo at the 2015 World Aquatics Championships was held between 26 July and 8 August 2015 in Kazan, Russia.

Schedule
Two competitions were held.

All time are local (UTC+3).

Medal summary

Medal table

Medal events

References

External links
Official website
Records and statistics (reports by Omega)

 
Water polo
2015
2015
World Aquatics Championships